Duane Harlan Cassidy (November 24, 1933 – February 8, 2016) was a general in the United States Air Force and the former commander of the Military Airlift Command and United States Transportation Command.

Early life
Cassidy was born in Coraopolis, Pennsylvania, in 1933. He earned a Bachelor of Science degree from the University of Nebraska in 1968 and a Master of Science degree from Troy State University in 1975. He completed Squadron Officer School in 1961 at the Industrial College of the Armed Forces in 1973, the J.L. Kellogg Graduate School of Management at Northwestern University in 1979, and the program for senior executives in national and international security at the John F. Kennedy School of Government, Harvard University, in 1983.

Military career
Upon completion of aviation cadet training, Cassidy was commissioned as a second lieutenant in 1954. He then attended navigator training at Harlingen and James Connally Air Force Bases, Texas. His initial operational assignments in the Air Force were to the Military Air Transport Service: first to the Air Weather Service's 6th Weather Group, Wright-Patterson Air Force Base, Ohio, flying B-25 Mitchells, and then to Air Rescue Service's 49th Air Rescue Squadron, Selfridge Air Force Base, Michigan. During these assignments, he participated in numerous rescue and weather reconnaissance missions, including the hydrogen weapons test in 1956 at Eniwetok Atoll in the Marshall Islands. His navigator assignments ended after two years as a Military Air Transport Service C-121 Constellation line crew member at Charleston Air Force Base, South Carolina. He entered pilot training in December 1958.

Cassidy was assigned to Strategic Air Command after graduation from pilot training and flew B-47 Stratojets at McCoy Air Force Base, Florida, Little Rock Air Force Base, Arkansas, and Lincoln Air Force Base, Nebraska. In November 1965, he transferred to Minot Air Force Base, North Dakota, and served with the 810th Strategic Aerospace Division, whose mission included B-52 Stratofortress bomber and LGM-30 Minuteman missile operations. In September 1968, he was assigned to the Republic of Vietnam, serving first with 7th Air Force's Tactical Air Control Center and then with the Military Assistance Command's Vietnam Directorate of Public Affairs as an air briefer to the Saigon press corps.

Cassidy returned to the Air Force airlift mission in October 1969. He was assigned to Military Airlift Command headquarters as executive to the deputy chief of staff for operations, and later as executive aide and pilot for the Military Airlift Command commander. In August 1972, he assumed command of the 8th Airlift Squadron, McChord Air Force Base, Washington. He entered the Air War College in August 1974 and, upon graduation, again served at Military Airlift Command headquarters, as assistant chief of staff.

In August 1976, Cassidy was assigned as vice commander of the 63rd Airlift Wing at Norton Air Force Base, California. In February 1978, he became commander of the wing. He returned to Military Airlift Command headquarters in July 1980 and served initially as assistant deputy chief of staff for operations. In August 1981, he became the command's deputy chief of staff for operations.

From October 1983 to August 1984, Cassidy served as commander of Military Airlift Command's 21st Air Force at McGuire Air Force Base, New Jersey During this period, Military Airlift Command was heavily involved in support of United States' operations in Lebanon and Grenada. General Cassidy then transferred to Headquarters United States Air Force, Washington D.C., where he served as deputy chief of staff for manpower and personnel. He was promoted to general November 8, 1985, with same date of rank. The general assumed command of Military Airlift Command in September 1985 and of the United States Transportation Command upon its activation Oct. 1, 1987.

Cassidy died from cancer on February 8, 2016, and was buried at Arlington National Cemetery on November 18.

Awards
Awards earned during his career:

Command pilot and senior navigator with more than 8,000 flying hours.
In 2006 he was inducted into the Airlift/Tanker Association Hall of Fame.

References

External links

General Duane H. Cassidy (An oral history)

1933 births
2016 deaths
United States Air Force personnel of the Korean War
United States Air Force personnel of the Vietnam War
United States Air Force generals
American Cold War bomber pilots
Recipients of the Air Medal
Recipients of the Order of the Sword (United States)
Recipients of the Legion of Merit
People from Coraopolis, Pennsylvania
University of Nebraska alumni
Air Command and Staff College alumni
National War College alumni
Troy University alumni
Kellogg School of Management alumni
Harvard Kennedy School alumni
Military personnel from Pennsylvania